Jean-Louis Duport (4 October 17497 September 1819), sometimes known as Duport the Younger to distinguish him from his older brother (and teacher) Jean-Pierre (1741-1818), was a cellist, pedagogue, and composer.

He is perhaps best known today for his 21 études for solo cello that constitute the final part of the "Essai sur le doigté du violoncelle et sur la conduite de l'archet" ("Essay on the fingering of the violoncello and on the conduct of the bow") (1806), a seminal work of cello technique.  He also wrote six cello concertos and his Études pour violoncello.

In 1812, Jean-Louis returned to Paris, where he encountered Napoleon, who insisted on trying out Duport's Stradivarius cello, exclaiming, "How the devil do you hold this thing, Monsieur Duport?" Duport was so obviously afraid that Napoleon would damage it, that Napoleon laughingly returned it to the cellist's more careful hands. Actually, Napoleon had made a small dent in the ribs of the cello, which may still be seen in the instrument. It was later owned by Auguste Franchomme and also Mstislav Rostropovich.

"Essay on the fingering of the violoncello and on the conduct of the bow"

"Essai sur le doigté du violoncelle et sur la conduite de l'archet" ("Essay on the fingering of the violoncello and on the conduct of the bow") is a seminal work of cello technique, by Duport, published by Imbault in Paris in 1806. The French text of 175 pages discusses in detail a wide range of aspects of cello technique, and is followed by 21 Etudes for two cellos, of various difficulty levels. The work has been translated into English and German, and is widely accepted as the most influential pedagogical work for the instrument.

References

External links
 Jean-Pierre and Jean-Louis Duport A biography of the Duport brothers at the Internet Cello Society
 

French classical cellists
French composers
French male composers
1749 births
1819 deaths
Burials at Père Lachaise Cemetery